Grupe is a German-language surname. Notable people with the surname include:

 Marion Grupe, East German sprint canoer
 Tommy Grupe (born 1992), German footballer

References 

German-language surnames